Pionerskaya metro station may refer to:
Pionerskaya (Moscow Metro), a station of the Moscow Metro, Moscow, Russia
Pionerskaya (Saint Petersburg Metro), a station of the Saint Petersburg Metro, Saint Petersburg, Russia
Pionerskaya metrotram station, a metrotram station of Volgograd Metrotram, Volgograd, Russia

See also
 Pionersky (disambiguation)